Windsor, an electoral district of the Legislative Assembly in the Australian state of New South Wales was created in 1859 and abolished in 1880.


Election results

Elections in the 1880s

1880 by-election

Elections in the 1870s

1877

1874

1872

Elections in the 1860s

1869

1864

1860

1860 by-election

Elections in the 1850s

1859

References

New South Wales state electoral results by district